The European Aquatics Championships is the continental Aquatics championship for Europe, which is organised by LEN—the governing body for aquatics in Europe. The Championships are currently held every two years (in even years); and since 2022, they have included 5 aquatics disciplines: Swimming (long course/50m pool), Diving, Synchronised swimming, Open water swimming and High diving. Prior to 1999, the championships also included Water polo, which beginning in 1999 LEN split-off into a separate championships. The open water events are not held during the Olympic year.

The Championships are generally held over a two-week time-period in mid-to-late Summer; however, in the most recent Summer Olympics years (2004, 2008, 2012, 2016 and 2020), the Championships were moved to the Spring to be moved away from the Summer Olympic Games.

The swimming portion of these championships is considered one of the pre-eminent swimming competitions in the world. Note however that LEN also conducts an annual short-course (25 meters) swimming  championship, which is a completely separate and a completely distinct event (typically held in early December).

Championships
Historically, the Championships were first held in 1926, and included water polo prior to 1999 when the discipline was moved to the European Water Polo Championship. From 1973-1999 Europeans were held in years without a Summer Olympics or World Championships, save 1979 (1973 being the inception year of the World Championships; and 1999 being the last year before Worlds moved from even-years between Summer Olympics to every-odd year beginning in 2001). Women were first allowed to participate at the second Championships in 1927

Medal tables (1926–2022)

Overall

Note: The table includes medals won in swimming (since 1926), diving (since 1926), synchronized swimming (since 1974), open water swimming (since 1991), high diving (since 2022) and water polo since 1926 until and including 1997 when the discipline was part of the event. From 1999 the water polo event was separated and got its own independent tournament as European Water Polo Championship.

As of 2022, Albania, Andorra, Azerbaijan, Cyprus, Georgia, Gibraltar, Kosovo, Latvia, Liechtenstein, Luxembourg, Macedonia, Malta, Moldova, Monaco, Montenegro and San Marino have yet to win a medal.

Swimming (1926–2022)
See LEN official report.

Diving (1926–2022)

Artistic swimming (1974–2022)

Open water swimming (1991–2022)

High diving (2022)

Water polo (1926–1997)

Multiple medalists in swimming (long course)
 Update after the 2022 European Aquatics Championships.

Men

Women

Championships records

See also
 List of European Aquatics Championships medalists in swimming (men)
 List of European Aquatics Championships medalists in swimming (women)
 List of European Aquatics Championships medalists in open water swimming
 List of European Aquatics Championships medalists in artistic swimming
 European Short Course Swimming Championships

References

External links

Swim Rankings results
The event at SVT's open archive 

 
Aquatics
Recurring sporting events established in 1926
Swimming competitions in Europe
European Aquatics Championships